Amer International Group Ltd is a high-tech industrial enterprise, mainly dealing in non-ferrous metals and non-metallic materials. The company was founded by Chinese business magnate Wang Wenyin. Currently the company has four domestic headquarters located in Shenzhen (head office), Shanghai, Tianjin, and Chongqing, and three international headquarters in Singapore, Geneva and Los Angeles. Amer International Group has six major business sectors and investment fields: health care, energy, finance, manufacturing, resources and culture.

Amer International Group has 18 industrial parks, 3 commodity exchange centers and one "technology and innovation center" located across 13 different provinces.

The company was founded in 1995 in Shenzhen. From 2013 to 2018 Amer rose from 397th (2013) to 111th (2018) place at the Fortune Global 500 list with a turnover of $72.766 billion and net profit of $1.545 billion (2018). In 2018 Amer was ranked as 2nd largest private manufacturing enterprise and 3rd private enterprise within China.  
In 2015, American molybdenum mineral development, exploration, and mining company General Moly announced a strategic partnership with Amer International Group. According to the terms of the partnership, Amer acquired 40 million of Moly's shares and procured a $700 million loan for the development of the Mt. Hope Project.

The company was also in talks to buy English football club Southampton for £246 million in March 2017.

References

Copper mining companies of China
Chinese companies established in 1995